is an urban park in Suginami, Tokyo. It opened on October 1, 1981, and was created from the residence of music critic Motoo Ōtaguro, where he lived from 1933 until his death in 1979.

Ōtaguro's piano, a 1900 Steinway & Sons, is preserved in a building in the park.

References

Bibliography

 
 
 

Parks and gardens in Tokyo
Urban public parks in Japan
1981 establishments in Japan